Vice Admiral Sir Horace Collier Lyddon  (28 September 1912  – 9 June 1968) was a Royal Navy officer who became President of the Royal Naval College, Greenwich.

Naval career
Lyddon joined the Royal Navy in 1930 and served in World War II as Deputy Secretary to the Commander-in-Chief, Eastern Fleet from 1942 until 1944 when he became Secretary to the Commander, 5th Cruiser Squadron. He became Secretary to the Second-in-Command Mediterranean Fleet in 1949, naval secretary in Washington, D.C. in 1950 and secretary to the Commander-in-Chief, The Nore in 1952. He went on to be Executive Assistant to the Deputy Supreme Allied Commander Atlantic in 1954, Commanding Officer of the shore establishment HMS Phoenicia in 1958 and Director of Service Conditions at the British Admiralty in 1960. After that he became Rear Admiral (Personnel) at Naval Air Command in 1962, Director General of Naval Manpower in 1964 and President of the Royal Naval College, Greenwich in 1967 until his death in 1968.

Rugby union
Lyddon was also an accomplished rugby player. He played for Barbarian F.C., Navy, Devon, and Hampshire before the Second World War, and captained Hampshire and United Services Portsmouth teams in 1939. Lyddon served as president of the Royal Navy Rugby Union in 1967 and also served as naval member of the Rugby Football Union.

References

1912 births
1968 deaths
Royal Navy vice admirals
Knights Commander of the Order of the British Empire
Companions of the Order of the Bath
Admiral presidents of the Royal Naval College, Greenwich
Barbarian F.C. players
Sportspeople from Plymouth, Devon
Royal Navy logistics officers
Royal Navy officers of World War II
Military personnel from Plymouth, Devon